This was a new event of the WTA 125K series.

Misaki Doi and Xu Yifan won the tournament, defeating Yaroslava Shvedova and Zhang Shuai in the final, 6–1, 6–4.

Seeds

Draw

References 
 Draw

Nanjing Ladies Open - Doubles
Nanjing Ladies Open